Tombu-e Pain (also Romanized as Tombū-e Pā’īn; also known as Tonbū-e Pāyīn) is a village in Dar Pahn Rural District, Senderk District, Minab County, Hormozgan Province, Iran. At the 2006 census, its population was 135, in 28 families.

References 

Populated places in Minab County